Marcel Ruschmeier (born 20 August 1995) is a German footballer who plays as a defender for Oberliga Niedersachsen club SC Spelle-Venhaus.

References

External links
 Profile at FuPa.net

1995 births
Living people
German footballers
Association football defenders
VfL Osnabrück players
3. Liga players
Oberliga (football) players